Pasión y poder (English title: Passion and Power) is a Mexican telenovela produced by José Alberto Castro for Televisa. It is a remake of the Mexican telenovela Pasión y poder, produced in 1988. It was created by Marrisa Garrido and developed by Ximena Suárez.

The series stars Jorge Salinas as Arturo, Fernando Colunga as Eladio, Susana González as Julia and Marlene Favela as Nina.

Plot 
Pasión y poder revolves around family dramas and corporate powers of two rival families. The rivalry that originated many years ago, when Arturo Montenegro and Eladio Gómez Luna both fell in love with the beautiful Julia Vallado. Eladio ultimately married her. Years later, Julia Vallado is a very unhappy woman having to suffer from abuse and therefore endures the wickedness of her husband, with her only consolation, is the love of his son David, a complete antithesis of his father.Arturo however is married to Nina a very ambitious woman who even though is in love with Arturo wallows in all his riches. Together they have three children, Eric the eldest who is wicked and tries hard to follow in his father's footsteps. Regina the second oldest who is very kind, beautiful and hardworking and the last born being Daniella who is ambitious like her mother with a wicked heart and jealous of Regina's undeniable beauty. Arturo also has an older son Miguel from a woman who died before he married Nina. Miguel is secretly in love with Consuelo Eric's wife who alsolso has to endure Eric's wickedness unaware that he is having an affair with a model called Montserrat. Regina is engaged and ready to be married by his fiancé Joshua who ultimately crashes his bike with David Gomez Luna (Eladio's son) hence causing an accident that will tie their lives forever. The accident causes the two rival families to meet once more in the hospital. David is badly injured while Joshua is discharged immediately only to be seduced by Daniella hence ending up kissing to Regina's dismay who finds them in the act and ends up breaking her engagement.Tired of his father's wickedness and comparing him to Franco Eladio's godson who unlike David is entirely loyal to Eladio he decides to leave for a vacation. There, David meets Daniella Montenegro and they start a romance but Daniella ends the relationship realizing David was not rich enough. David is therefore brokenhearted and realizes that all Montenegro's are evil. After getting a job offer as an engineer he accepts only to find out he is partnered with Regina Montenegro. Their work relationship starts off as a rocky start since David thinks that Regina is very much wicked like her sister Daniella. Over time they grow closer David realising that Regina is hardworking and kindhearted hence their relationship grows into an undeniable love. They are followed by the dilemma of confessing their love to their families hoping that it would be a chance for peace between them. However it would seem impossible for them since Daniella who regrets dumping David tries every thing possible to win him back. Elsewhere Arturo and Julia rekindle their feelings for each hence making Nina and Eladio to join forces and prevent the two from being together. Will love overcome hatred and power??!

Cast

Main 

 Jorge Salinas as Arturo Montenegro 
Fernando Colunga as Eladio Gomez Luna 
Susana González as Julia Vallado de Gomez Luna 
Marlene Favela as Nina de Montenegro

Also main 

Michelle Renaud as Regina Montenegro 
Altaír Jarabo as Consuelo Martínez
José Pablo Minor as David Gómez Luna 
Alejandro Nones as Erick Montenegro  
Danilo Carrera  as Franco Herrera
Fabiola Guajardo as Gabriela Díaz
Marco Méndez as Agustín Ornelas
Jaume Mateu as Miguel Montenegro
Irina Baeva as Daniela Montenegro
Enrique Montaño as Justino
Geraldo Albarrán as El Callao
Boris Duflos as Francisco
Raquel Olmedo as Gisela Fuentes 
Luis Bayardo as Humberto Vallado
Alejandro Aragón as Aldo
Raquel Garza as Petra / Samanta 
Ericka García as Maribel 
Pilar Escalante as Ángeles
Óscar Medellín as Joshua Solares
Daniela Fridman as Marintia 
Jorge Bolaños as Santos
Victoria Camacho as Montserrat Moret 
Gema Garoa as Clara Álvarez
Issabela Camil as Caridad

Recurring 
Fabián Pizzorno as Ashmore 
Mara Matosic

Awards and nominations

Broadcast 
The series originally aired from October 5, 2015, to April 10, 2016, in Mexico on Canal de las Estrellas. The series premiered on November 3, 2015, to April 28, 2016, in United States on Univision.

Ratings

References

External links 

Televisa telenovelas
Mexican telenovelas
2015 telenovelas
2015 Mexican television series debuts
2016 Mexican television series endings
Television series reboots
Spanish-language telenovelas